Adriana Gascoigne is an American technology executive and activist, the  founder and Chief Executive Officer of Girls in Tech, a global non-profit dedicated to empowering, educating, and mentoring women in the technology industry.

Career

Early career
Gascoigne graduated from University of California, Davis with a bachelor's degree in Sociology and Economics. After graduating, Gascoigne served in a number of executive roles, including Vice President of Product Marketing for RxMatch, Chief Marketing Officer of QwikCart, Vice President of Digital for Ogilvy & Mather, and Vice President of Marketing for SecondMarket.

Girls in Tech 
Adriana Gascoigne is the founder and CEO of Girls in Tech (GIT), a Nashville-based non-profit organization devoted to empowering, educating and engaging women in the tech industry. She is also the author of Tech Boss Lady: How To Start-Up, Disrupt, And Thrive As A Female Founder, and a board member on WAPPP, Harvard Kennedy School's Women in Public Policy Program.

More than a decade ago, Adriana found herself a victim of discrimination and harassment as the lone female executive as a Silicon Valley startup. From that experience, she was inspired to help other women and thus founded GIT, which today advocates for diversity and inclusion in STEM fields. 

GIT boasts 57 chapters throughout the world. It comprises an active, engaged community of more than 80,000 members in 42 countries. Hundreds of events and programs are held throughout the year and are tailored to address the unique needs of local chapters. 

Through her leadership at GIT, Adriana has improved diversity in the tech workforce; encouraged policy change at government, corporate and community levels; inspired women to pursue any career they wish; and, created impact-oriented courses to support women throughout their career. 

No stranger to growing brands and building amazing companies, Adriana has worked with tech companies like hi5, Algentis, Jam City, Indiegogo, Social Gaming Network (SGN), ImpulseFlyer, RxMatch and QwikCart. She has also served in executive roles at Ogilvy & Mather, Interpublic Group of Companies, and SecondMarket.
Adriana holds a bachelor’s degree in Sociology with a concentration in Organizational Studies and has a minor in Communications from the University of California at Davis. 

Adriana’s accolades include:

• Receiving a Singularity University Impact Fellow Scholarship 

• Being named one of the 20 most influential Latinos in technology in 2018 by CNET

• Winning the 2018 Pioneer Leadership Award at the Silicon Valley Latino Leadership Summit.

References

External links
 Adriana Gascoigne on Facebook

Activists from the San Francisco Bay Area
American nonprofit executives
American technology chief executives
University of California, Davis alumni
People from San Mateo County, California
Living people
Year of birth missing (living people)
American women chief executives
21st-century American women